I Am Anonymous is the first studio album by English progressive metal band Headspace, released on 22 May 2012.

Background
According to Adam Wakeman, "I Am Anonymous is a heavily guitar oriented record. That wasn’t the intention, but [Pete Rinaldi] is a killer guitar player, and the album just evolved the way it did."

On Headspace official website, it is specified that the album "is about you [the listener] and your relationship with humanity, ultimately the battles fought within the mind from child to man". The Kübler-Ross model is cited as an important element of the lyric's meaning.

Track listing

Personnel 
 Damian Wilson – lead vocals
 Pete Rinaldi – guitars
 Lee Pomeroy – bass
Adam Wakeman – keyboards
 Richard Brook – drums

References

2012 debut albums
Headspace (band) albums